Jeffrey D. Wagner (born April 2, 1960) is a Republican politician who first held office as Seneca County Commissioner from 1996 to 2002. He was then elected to the Ohio House of Representatives 81st District and served from 2003 to 2011. Due to term limitations, he vacated the House seat and was elected to the Seneca County Board of Commissioners as Vice President in 2011. Later that same year, he expressed interest in an Ohio Senate seat vacated by Karen Gillmor, but never pursued appointment. Wagner was one of the three Seneca County Commissioners responsible for the destruction of the historic 1884 Seneca County courthouse in 2012.

Electoral history

References

Living people
Republican Party members of the Ohio House of Representatives
1960 births
21st-century American politicians
People from Sycamore, Ohio